"Shouting for the Gunners" was a single released by the English football team Arsenal, with Tippa Irie and Peter Hunnigale on 3 May 1993. It reached number 34 in the UK Singles Chart.

References

1993 singles
Arsenal F.C. songs
Football songs and chants
1993 songs